This is a list of Billboard magazine's Top 30 popular songs of 1954 according to retail sales.

See also
1954 in music

References

1954 record charts
Billboard charts